Heterorachis diaphana is a species of moth of the  family Geometridae. It is found in Madagascar.

The forewings & hindwings of this species are very transparent, pale yellow-green, rippled with white; costa finely ochreous; the fringe is pale green, cell spot black.

It has an expanse of 21mm.  The holotype was collected North-East of Fianarantsoa in the Forrest of Ivohimanitra (North of Ambohimanga Sud).

References

Geometrinae
Moths described in 1899
Lepidoptera of Madagascar
Moths of Madagascar
Moths of Africa